The Heilongjiang Morning Post, or Heilongjiang Chenbao, also known as Heilongjiang Morning News,  was a Harbin-based Chinese-language daily newspaper published in China. 

Heilongjiang Morning Post was the first morning newspaper in the New China.  It was founded on October 24, 1992, when it was called Eastern Morning Post (东方晨报).

History
Heilongjiang Morning Post was established on October 24, 1992. On December 15, 2002, the online version of the Post was launched. 

On January 1, 2019, Heilongjiang Morning Post stopped publication.

References

Defunct newspapers published in China
Publications established in 1992
1992 establishments in China
Publications disestablished in 2019